Aridia Espinal (born c. 1988) is an American politician from New York.

Life
She was born in Queens, the daughter of immigrants from the Dominican Republic. She is a cousin of former Assembly member and former New York City councilman Rafael Espinal.

She entered politics as a Democrat, and was an aide to Assemblyman Francisco Moya. After Moya's election to the New York City Council, Espinal was nominated to run in a special election to fill the vacancy. She was elected on April 24, 2018, and took her seat in the 202nd New York State Legislature. On September 11, 2018, Espinal lost the Democratic primary to Catalina Cruz. In the general election on November 6, 2018, Espinal ran on the Working Families Party and the Women's Equality Party lines for re-election, but was again defeated by Cruz.

Personal Life and Interesting Facts

Ari Espinal is the legal guardian of an elderly man named Clayton Cameing, who is almost twice her age, as of the year 2013. Clayton has a developmental disability.  His mother  worked in the building that houses Francisco Moya's former New York State Assembly office in Queens where Ari worked.  Clayton and his mother lived in Brooklyn. She died in 2013 and Ari gained guardianship of Clayton.

References

1980s births
American politicians of Dominican Republic descent
Hispanic and Latino American state legislators in New York (state)
Hispanic and Latino American women in politics
Living people
Politicians from Queens, New York
Women state legislators in New York (state)
Working Families Party politicians
Democratic Party members of the New York State Assembly
21st-century American women